The 2019–20 Hartford Hawks women's basketball team represented the University of Hartford during the 2019–20 NCAA Division I women's basketball season.

Roster

Schedule

|-
!colspan=9 style=| Non-conference regular season

|-
!colspan=9 style=| America East regular season

References

Hartford Hawks women's basketball seasons
Hartford
Hartford Hawks women's b
Hartford Hawks women's b